Castleside is a village in County Durham, England.
 It is situated a short distance to the south-west of Consett. The village centre is located on the main A68 road which runs between Edinburgh and Darlington and the village crossroads allow easy access to Consett, the North Pennines and Stanhope.  To the northeast lies another small village called Moorside.

The parish church, dedicated to St John, was designed by Ewan Christian and is a reproduction of a church he had seen and admired while on holiday in Switzerland. The church was consecrated on 7 March 1867.

Castleside is covered by the civil parish of Healeyfield.

The nearby dwelling of Wharnley Burn is a 14th century cottage and was home to the moss trooper Thomas Raw (d. 1714). He was buried in a field near his home believing he could not be buried in a church. In the early 1860s the grave was opened and the grave slab removed, supposedly to Satley.

References

External links

Healeyfield Parish Council

Villages in County Durham